|}

The Hever Sprint Stakes is a Listed flat horse race in Great Britain open to horses aged four years and over.
It is run at Lingfield Park over a distance of 5 furlongs and 6 yards, and it is scheduled to take place each year in February or March.

The race was first run in 2003, and was awarded Listed status in 2007.

Records

Most successful horse (2 wins):
 Arganil – 2009, 2010

Leading jockey (3 wins):
 Neil Callan – King Orchisios (2007), Arganil (2009, 2010)

Leading trainer (3 wins):
 Kevin Ryan – King Orchisios (2007), Arganil (2009, 2010)

Winners

See also
 Horse racing in Great Britain
 List of British flat horse races

References

Racing Post:

Flat races in Great Britain
Lingfield Park Racecourse
Open sprint category horse races
2003 establishments in England
Recurring sporting events established in 2003